Why Liberalism Failed is a 2018 book by Patrick Deneen, a professor of political science at the University of Notre Dame. It criticizes both forms of American liberalism – "classical liberalism," typically called in America "libertarianism"; and "progressive/ modern liberalism," often simply called "liberal."

Synopsis
Why Liberalism Failed is a critique of political, social, and economic liberalism as practiced by both American Democrats and Republicans.  According to Deneen, "we should rightly wonder whether America is not in the early days of its eternal life but rather approaching the end of the natural cycle of corruption and decay that limits the lifespan of all human creations." The book argues that liberalism has exhausted itself, leading to income inequality, cultural decline, the erosion of freedoms, and the growth of powerful, centralized bureaucracies.

Reviews
In a review for The New York Review of Books, Robert Kuttner described the book as "convenient for conservatives looking to blame all ills on liberals", to oppose globalization and market fundamentalism, perceiving liberalism as "a dangerous betrayal of deeper sources of culture and civilization such as the family, the tribe, the nation, and the church".

Writing in The Week, Damon Linker described it as "the most electrifying book of cultural criticism published in some time", adding that Deneen argues that liberalism failed because it succeeded. But Linker wrote that he did not find "especially persuasive" the claim made in the book that the Western liberal world was nearing its end.

44th United States President Barack Obama wrote in 2018 that, while he disagrees with many of the conclusions of the book, Why Liberalism Failed "offers cogent insights into the loss of meaning and community that many in the West feel, issues that liberal democracies ignore at their own peril".

Jennifer Szalai for The New York Times wrote that it "speaks to a profound discontent with the political establishment" and that Deneen echoes the popular 2016 election sentiment that both parties were the same.  She adds that the book doesn't only attribute liberalism to one side but mostly to political elites orthodoxy dating to 500 years ago. She describes the book as "a deeply exasperating volume that nevertheless articulates something important in this age of disillusionment".  Deneen proposes a more traditional society where "preferably religious communities tend to the land and look after their own" and is critical of a women's liberation that pushed them into capitalism.

In its review of the book, The Economist argued that Deneen "does an impressive job of capturing the current mood of disillusionment, echoing left-wing complaints about rampant commercialism, right-wing complaints about narcissistic and bullying students, and general worries about atomisation and selfishness", but criticized him for failing to actually convince that the only way to solve the problem is abandoning liberalism. The magazine concludes that "the best way to read Why Liberalism Failed is not as a funeral oration but as a call to action: up your game, or else."

Park MacDougald wrote for New York that Deneen from a right-wing point of view criticizes liberalism not because of its materialist failures but from a philosophical standpoint and "what he sees as a liberal redefinition of the ancient and medieval concept of freedom, or libertas", that "liberalism's big innovation was to reject this classical understanding as unrealistic, unscientific, and oppressive".  He concludes that "Why Liberalism Failed is a polemic, if an elegantly argued one, and it contains some of the drawbacks of the genre".

Paleoconservative Paul Gottfried wrote in The Independent Review that, while he agrees with much of the criticism of liberalism, he also finds several idiosyncrasies in the book, describing it as "an anti-modernist Catholic polemic that has elicited praise and support from unexpected admirers".

Writing for the National Review, Christian Alejandro Gonzalez was critical towards the book, arguing that "Patrick Deneen’s critique of liberalism exhibits an undue nostalgia for the past and ingratitude for the virtues of the present".

In a review for The Washington Times, Aram Bakshian Jr. wrote that the book "lucidly explains how liberalism has trapped itself in its own labyrinth", but fails to offer a credible alternative to it: Bakshian is particularly critical towards Deneen’s propositions for a new post-liberal society, arguing that such visions "totters on the edge of New Age absurdity", comparing it to Jean-Jacques Rousseau's ideal of the Noble Savage.

The conservative political journal American Affairs has published commentaries on the book by Polish philosopher Ryszard Legutko and Harvard University Law professor Adrian Vermeule.

References

2018 non-fiction books
English-language books
Books about liberalism
Yale University Press books